Piparo is a village in Central Trinidad on the southern edge of the Central Range.  The village has three main claims to fame:

 Piparo was the base of operations of Dole Chadee (born Nankissoon Boodram), a notorious drug lord who was executed in 1999 for the murder of four members of the Baboolal family.
 Piparo was the home of Ras Shorty I (born Garfield Blackman) during his self-imposed break from the soca world.  Living simply in this rural community Ras Shorty-I developed Jamoo, a fusion of soca and gospel music.
 Piparo was the site of a large mud volcano eruption on February 22, 1997.  The eruption covered an area of 2.5 km² and displaced 31 families. The mud volcano now lies active where the eruption took place ( as of October 2019).

During the early twentieth century, Piparo was an important cocoa bean producer.

The small village is mainly inhabited by people of African and Indian descent. There is a mandir, two mosques, and three churches.

Since the eruption in 1997, an alternate road to the village has been established through the village of Guaracara or a detour around the volcanic site through Panchoo trace.

References 

Villages in Trinidad and Tobago
Mud volcanoes